Padarn Beisrudd ap Tegid (lit. Paternus of the Scarlet Robe, son of Tegid) was the son of a Bishop named Tegid ap Iago, who may have been born with the Roman name of Tacitus. Padarn is believed to have been born in the early 4th century in the Old North (or Hen Gogledd) of Roman Britain. According to Old Welsh tradition, his grandson, King Cunedda, came from Manaw Gododdin, the modern Clackmannanshire region of Scotland.

One traditional interpretation identifies Padarn as a Roman (or Romano-British) official of reasonably high rank who was placed in command of the Votadini troops stationed in Clackmannanshire in the 380s or earlier by Roman Emperor Magnus Maximus. Alternatively, he may have been a frontier chieftain in the same region who was granted Roman military rank, a practice attested elsewhere along the empire's borders at the time. His command in part of what is now Scotland probably lasted until his death and was then assumed by his son Edern (Edeyrn=Eternus). Edern was the father of Cunedda, founder of the Kingdom of Gwynedd.

The coat of Padarn is one of the Thirteen Treasures of the Island of Britain.  The coat is said to perfectly fit any well-born nobleman, but not a churl. The Life of Saint Padarn confuses this Padarn with the saint, and contains a story about how King Arthur tried to steal his tunic and became a Christian afterward.

In literature and film
In M J Trow's fictional Britannia series, Padarn Beisrudd is one of the central characters. He is given the Latinised name of Paternus and portrayed as a limitanei soldier guarding Hadrian's Wall.

References

4th-century births
4th-century deaths
Ancient Romans in Britain
Britons of the North